Brunellia cayambensis is a species of plant in the Brunelliaceae family. It is native to Ecuador and Colombia.

References

cayambensis
Flora of Ecuador
Flora of Colombia
Plants described in 1970
Vulnerable plants
Taxonomy articles created by Polbot